Alexander Garbis (born 3 January 1921) was an Indian cricketer. He played three first-class matches for Bengal between 1946 and 1948.

See also
 List of Bengal cricketers

References

External links
 

1921 births
Possibly living people
Indian cricketers
Bengal cricketers
Cricketers from Kolkata